The Ghana Prisons Service is responsible for the safe custody of prisoners in Ghana, as well as their welfare, reformation and rehabilitation. It is under the jurisdiction of the Ministry of the Interior.

Administration
The prisons service is governed by the Prisons Service Council, an advisory and supervisory body. Its Functions includes advising the President on "matters of policy in relation to the organisation and maintenance of the prisons system in Ghana."

The Prisons Headquarters in the Greater Accra region houses the Controller-General of Prisons and two Deputy Controller-General of Prisons, Seven Controllers of Prisons and other principal office holders.

The current Director General of the service is Patrick Darko Missah.

Prisons
There are 47 prison establishments in Ghana, including twelve major male prisons. These male prisons are located in Akuse, Kumasi, Sekondi, Tamale, Nsawam, Ho, Sunyani, Navrongo, Wa, Tarkwa, Winneba, and Cape Coast. The country also has seven major female prisons, located in Akuse, Ho, Nsawam, Sekondi, Sunyani, Kumasi, and Tamale. In addition, there are local prisons sited throughout the country. The James Camp Prison near Accra, and Ankaful near Cape Coast, are both Open Camp Prisons. Ghana's prisons house between 11,000 and 14,000 inmates, with females forming approximately 2% of the prison population.

Prisons in Ghana are classified based on their level of security, and on the activities undertaken at the various establishments:

 In the Central Prisons, trade training facilities are provided to equip prisoners with employable skills for their effective reintegration into society.  They take custody of long-sentenced prisoners. Central Prisons are the central points for all categories of prisoners, with the exception of condemned prisoners.
 Local Prisons are mainly responsible for the safe custody and welfare of inmates, due to the lack of space for trade training activities.  They usually take custody of short-sentenced prisoners.
 Open Camp Prisons undertake agricultural activities to provide food and train inmates in modern agricultural practices.  Prisoners who are about to be released are at times transferred to these facilities as transit to prepare them for their final release into society.
 In Agricultural Settlement Camps, the level of security is quite relaxed; they are usually not fenced.  The main objective is to train inmates in agricultural activities, and to produce enough food to supplement the feeding of inmates and generate some income for the Prisons Service.

Staff
The Ghana Prisons Service has 6,200 officers and staff. Twenty percent of the staff are women. In 2017 the staff strength of the service was 5,898.

Prison conditions

The main challenge that confronts the service is a persistent lack of funds. One effect of this, evident since 1972, is that the service is unable to ensure that convicts do not reoffend. Other challenges that face the service include prison overcrowding, lack of sanitation, and poor prison infrastructure. Some of the prisons are extremely outdated. For example, the almost 400 years old James Fort Prison in Accra was in use as a prison until 2008. It was originally built for 200 slaves, but housed over 740 male and female prisoners.

 Insufficient budget allocation for Reformation Programmes – prisoners are generally unskilled and unmotivated as they enter prison.  There are many deficiencies to be corrected and funding is needed for the programmes to be effective.
 Poor accommodation structures – old and weak structures and poor architectural designs unsuitable for long detention of people.  Overcrowding often leads to poor sanitation and health problems.
 Stigmatization of prisoners – stigmatization of prisoners leads to dejection and reoffending which lead to recidivism and high crime rate undermines efforts of reformation and rehabilitation of prisons.
 Lack of support from public to reform and reintegrate prisoners after their release.

Human rights issues 
Squalid conditions, poor food and overcrowding in Ghana's prisons were called "cruel, inhuman and degrading treatment," by the UN in 2013. The extent of prison overcrowding is estimated to be higher than the government's official figures. Prison authorities use a system where inmates known as "black coats" whip other misbehaving prisoners with canes.

Training 
Training of prison officers is done at the Prisons Service Training School. The school was established as the Warders' Training Depot in September, 1947. The purpose of the school is to train the Ghanaians to meet the administrative and operational needs of the Ghana Prisons Service. There are courses for recruits, officer cadet and special courses. The school admitted its first cadet officers 1974.

Statistics 
As of 2015, Patrick Darko Missah the then Deputy Controller in charge of Finance and Administration of the Ghana Prisons Service revealed that there were 14, 585 inmates with 11,581  convicts and 3004 on remand. The inmate numbers were more than what the prisons in the country could handle. This was due to the fact that apart from Nsawam Medium Security Prisons, Ankaful, and the Kete Krachi Prisons which were purpose built, all other prisons were makeshifts from warehouses, stores, and silos among others, meant to house goods.

United Nations support

The United Nations Development Programme (UNDP) is supporting the reorganisation of the Ghana Prisons Service under a four-year project, focusing on human rights development. As part of the restructuring, the Borstal Institute for Juveniles is now called the Senior Correctional Centre.

See also
 Ministry of Interior (Ghana)
 Borstal Institute for Juveniles

References

Law enforcement in Ghana
Ministries and Agencies of State of Ghana